Mateus dos Anjos (born June 10, 1983 in Minas Gerais) is a Brazilian soccer player, currently without a club.

Career

College
Dos Anjos grew up in Belo Horizonte, but moved from his native Brazil to the United States in 2001 to attend and play college soccer at Rockland Community College, and later Southern Connecticut State University. At Rockland he was named to his all-Conference teams in both his years there, while at Southern Connecticut State he was named to the All Conference second team in 2003 and the All Conference first team in 2004.

Professional
Dos Anjos trained with the MetroStars of Major League Soccer in 2004 before turning professional in 2005 with the Atlanta Silverbacks of the USL First Division Since then, Dos Anjos's career has taken him from the United States, to Brazil, and even Moldova, and has included stints with the Western Mass Pioneers, FC Olimpia Bălţi, Miami FC and twice with Crystal Palace Baltimore. After leaving CP Baltimore in July 2009, Dos Anjos travelled to Honduras and signed a contract with Hispano FC in the Honduran Premier League where he played for one season. At the end of the 2009 season, he was released from his contract for personal reasons.

Dos Anjos also has indoor soccer experience, having played with the New Jersey Ironmen of the Major Indoor Soccer League since September 2007.

Career statistics
(correct as of 30 June 2009)

References

External links
Crystal Palace Baltimore bio
InfoSport combine bio

1983 births
Living people
Atlanta Silverbacks players
Brazilian footballers
Brazilian expatriate footballers
Expatriate footballers in Moldova
Brazilian expatriate sportspeople in Moldova
USL Second Division players
Crystal Palace Baltimore players
USL First Division players
Miami FC (2006) players
New Jersey Ironmen (MISL) players
Real Maryland F.C. players
Southern Connecticut Fighting Owls men's soccer players
Western Mass Pioneers players
Place of birth missing (living people)
CSF Bălți players
Association football midfielders
Association football defenders